Fresnoy-le-Grand is a commune in the Aisne department in Hauts-de-France in northern France.

Industry
The cookware manufacturer Le Creuset is based in the town and was founded there in 1925 by Armand Desaegher and Octave Aubecq.

Sport
The village has a strong athletic club which was formed in 1942 and is called the Association Sportive de Fresnoy (ASF).

Population
The inhabitants of Fresnoy-le-Grand are called Fresnoysiens in French.

See also
 Communes of the Aisne department

References

Communes of Aisne
Aisne communes articles needing translation from French Wikipedia